The Bozeman House is a historic house in rural Clark County, Arkansas.  It is located on the north side of Arkansas Highway 26, several miles west of Arkadelphia, the county seat.  It is a -story wood-frame house with Greek Revival styling.  The house was built c. 1847 by Michael Bozeman, one of the county's early settlers, and is one of the oldest structures standing in the county.  The main block is five bays wide, with a pedimented portico above the entrance on the southern facade.  A kitchen ell extends to the rear of the house from the northwestern corner, giving the house an L-shape.  The roof the main facade is pierced by a pair of gabled dormers.  The trim detailing includes entablatures and dentil moulding.

The house was listed on the National Register of Historic Places in 1978.

See also
National Register of Historic Places listings in Clark County, Arkansas

References

Houses on the National Register of Historic Places in Arkansas
Greek Revival houses in Arkansas
Houses completed in 1847
Houses in Clark County, Arkansas
1847 establishments in Arkansas
National Register of Historic Places in Clark County, Arkansas